Jozef Síkela (born 17 June 1967) is a Czech politician and investment banker who has served as Czech Minister of Industry and Trade in Petr Fiala's Cabinet since December 2021.

References

1967 births
Living people
People from Rokycany
Industry and Trade ministers of the Czech Republic
Government ministers of the Czech Republic
Mayors and Independents Government ministers
Czech businesspeople
Prague University of Economics and Business alumni